Yuri Nikolayevich Shleyev (born 26 June 1995) is a Russian football goalkeeper.

Club career
He made his debut in the Russian Professional Football League for FC Mashuk-KMV Pyatigorsk on 20 July 2015 in a game against PFC Spartak Nalchik.

He made his debut for the senior squad of FC Anzhi Makhachkala on 20 September 2017 in a Russian Cup game against FC Luch-Energiya Vladivostok.

Career statistics

Club

References

External links
 Profile by Russian Professional Football League

1995 births
Sportspeople from Samara, Russia
Living people
Russian footballers
Association football goalkeepers
FC Anzhi Makhachkala players
FC Spartak Moscow players
FC Ararat Moscow players
FC Mashuk-KMV Pyatigorsk players